The 2001–02 Scottish Second Division was won by Queen of the South who, along with second-placed Alloa Athletic, were promoted to the First Division. Greenock Morton were relegated to the Third Division. Stenhousemuir avoided relegation due to First Division Airdrieonians becoming insolvent, meaning that only one team was relegated from each of the First and Second divisions. This was also the last year that Clydebank would play in the Scottish Football League and were replaced by Airdrie United next season.

Table

Attendances
The average attendances for Scottish Second Division clubs for season 2001/02 are shown below:

Scottish Second Division seasons
2
3
Scot